Seth Irunsewe Kale , OON, CFR (June 6, 1904 –  November 19, 1994) was a Nigerian Anglican bishop who served as Principal of CMS Grammar School, Lagos from 1944 to 1950 and as Bishop of Lagos from 1963 to 1974.

He was consecrated a bishop on St Andrew's Day (30 November) 1963, by Cecil Patterson, Archbishop of West Africa. He holds the distinction of being the first African to preach in the famous St Paul's Cathedral, London.

Early life 
Kale was born the eldest son of the family of seven on June 6, 1904, in Ipata, Mobalufon, in Odogbolu Local Government of Ogun State. His parents Pa Jacob & Mama Victoria Kale were said to be the first Christian converts in the village. At birth he was given the Yoruba name Irunsewe meaning “we” (this one) “se” (happen); “irun” (nothing at all). On June 25, 1904 he was baptized with the name Seth.

Education 
He started his formal education at the Christ Church Primary School, Porogun, Ijebu-Ode in 1912 and later attended Ijebu Ode Grammar School. In 1931 with assistance from the then principal of Ijebu Ode Grammar School, Rev. I.O Ransome-Kuti, Kale became the first recipient of the prestigious Mojola Agbebi scholarship and was admitted to Fourah Bay College, Sierra Leone where he earned a general degree of Bachelor of Arts. Thereafter, he went on to do one additional year leading to the Diploma in Theology in 1935. The following year he was employed as a teacher at CMS Grammar School, Lagos. In 1939 he earned a post-graduate diploma in Education from the University of London.

Career 
Kale returned from London and was immediately appointed the acting principal of CMS Grammar School, Lagos, it took only three years before he  became the first Nigerian to be appointed principal of the school in the twentieth century. In 1921, He was one of the founding members of the National Union of Teachers, including Vice-Principal, Jonathan Lucas and Rev. I.O Ransome-Kuti. He was still a principal at CMS Grammar School, Lagos when he became a deacon at the Cathedral Church of Christ, Lagos in 1942, he was ordained a priest on the anniversary of his diaconate in 1943. He became the first Nigerian principal of the long established St. Andrew’s Teachers’ Training College, Oyo, in 1951. He was credited for restoring law and order in the college after years of alleged prejudices, class distinctions, and social differences, which had plagued the college . In 1963, at the Assembly of Church Prelates in Toronto, Rev. Kale was elected the Bishop of Lagos and was consecrated on November 30, 1963.

Personal life 
Kale was twenty-five years old when he married Juliana Oladunni Odukoya, the grand-daughter of Oluwa Idele of Ijebu-Ode. The couple were joined in holy matrimony on January 6, 1930 at St. Savior’s Church, Italupe, Ijebu-Ode. In 1969, he officiated the wedding of then president of Nigeria, Yakubu Gowon at the Cathedral Church of Christ, Lagos.

References

Bibliography
T'Ibi T'Ire, Oxford University Press, 1947

1904 births
1994 deaths
Anglican bishops of Lagos
Fourah Bay College alumni
Nigerian educational theorists
People from Ogun State
20th-century Anglican bishops in Nigeria
Ijebu Ode Grammar School alumni
Yoruba Christian clergy
Yoruba educators
Heads of schools in Nigeria
Educators from Lagos
Yoruba writers
Alumni of the University of London